Tarwa Watkai is a hill in Pakistan near the town of Hangu. It has an elevation of 1,285 metres and is east of Turkmān Zhêy, a mountain in Afghanistan that has an elevation of 1,225 metres.

References 

Hills of Pakistan